Ovezmammed Mammedov is a Turkmen politician. From 21 August 2012 until December 2017 he served as the leader of Party of Industrialists and Entrepreneurs of Turkmenistan - the first legal opposition party in Turkmenistan. 

In June 2013 he was elected to the Assembly of Turkmenistan from Lebap Province constituency. He is the first member of the Turkmen parliament not to belong to the Democratic Party of Turkmenistan.

References

Year of birth missing (living people)
Living people
Party of Industrialists and Entrepreneurs politicians